A Prayer for Katerina Horovitzova is a 1965 Czech television film about a young Jewish woman during World War II. It is based on Arnošt Lustig's novel of the same name.

Production
It is an adaptation of Arnošt Lustig's short novel first published in 1964. Lustig's novel is inspired by two real stories, one about American Jewish businessmen captured in Europe and the other one about Franceska Mann.

Plot
In 1943 a young Jewish woman Kateřina Horovitzová is placed in a group of wealthy Jewish men who bribe the Nazis in order to be exchanged to USA for captured SS officers.

Cast
 Jiří Adamíra as Bedřich Branske 
 Martin Růžek as Herrmann Cohen
 Lenka Fišerová as Kateřina Horovitzová
 Miloš Nedbal as Łódź rabbi Dajem
 Čestmír Řanda as Ludvík Rappaport
 Ilja Prachař as Oskar Löwenstein
 Felix le Breux as Valter Taubenstock
 Vladimír Ráž as Freddy Klarfeld
 Vladimír Hlavatý as Hugo Varacky
 Otto Šimánek as Tailor

Awards
International Critics Prize at 1965 Prix Italia 
Golden Nymph at 1965 Monte-Carlo Television Festival

References

External links

1960s war drama films
1960s Czech-language films
Czechoslovak black-and-white films
Czech war drama films
Holocaust films
1965 drama films
1965 films
Czech World War II films
Czechoslovak World War II films
1960s Czech films